The La Roulette was a French automobile manufactured from 1912 until 1914.  An 8/10 hp vee-twin cyclecar, it was built in Courbevoie.

References

Roulette, La